The Paralia ( - beach), also known as Medinat HaYam ( - country by the sea) was a coastal eparchy in Palestine during Hellenistic and Roman times, ruled by the Seleucid Empire between 197 and 99 BCE, as part of the Coele-Syria province. According to Josephus, the inhabitants of the region were primarily Greek city-dwellers. The name appears in the 6th-century Madaba Map, appended to the town of Ashdod-Yam, as Azotos Paralos, ca. 3 kilometers south of Modern Ashdod.

The region was originally set up by the Seleucids, along with the eparchies of Idumea and Galaaditis and neighbouring the eparchy of Samaria. Josephus wrote that the Paralia was outside Jewish jurisdiction throughout the Second Temple Period, except for a short period under the Hasmoneans and during the reign of Herod the Great and the Agrippas.

Etymology
The region was described as the Coastal Country in 1 Maccabees and 2 Maccabees.

In earlier Halakha it was described at "Medinat HaYam" (cities of the sea).

History
The region was originally set up by the Seleucids. The eparchy bordered Samaria, Idumea and Galaaditis, all part of the Coele-Syria province. Nicanor son of Patroclus was likely one of the governors of Paralia district, and was titled Cypriarch - apparently commanding some Cypriot garrison troops in the region, when Antiochus V Eupator acceded to the throne.

Part of the Paralia region was first conquered by Jews under the Hasmoneans. Simon Thassi captured Joppa in 143 BCE, John Hyrcanus captured Jamnia and Ashdod in 125 BCE, and between 103-99 BCE Alexander Jannaeus conquered the areas from Dora, northwards to Acra, and from Gaza, southwards to Rinocorura. The first penetration of Hasmoneans to Joppa was gradual - first a garrison was set up in the city, with later replacement of the pagan population by incoming Jews. Only Ashkelon was never conquered by the Hasmoneans.

Demographics
According to Josephus, the inhabitants of the region were primarily Greek city-dwellers.

See also

 Phoenice (Roman province)

Footnotes

Sources
 

2nd-century BC establishments in the Seleucid Empire
Jewish Seleucid history
History of Palestine (region)
Political entities in the Land of Israel
Seleucid colonies